Joe Bowker (12 June 1881 – 31 October 1955) was a British boxer who was world bantamweight champion from 1904 to 1905. His defeat of Frankie Neil on 17 October in London for the world bantamweight title was acclaimed as the most remarkable event in the sport in 1904.

During his career, Bowker also won the European and British bantamweight titles, and the British featherweight title, holding the world bantamweight and British featherweight titles simultaneously from March to October 1905. In 51 professional fights, he compiled a career record of 40 wins, 8 losses and one draw with two no-decisions. Fourteen wins came by knockout.

He was regarded as a "wonderfully clever" fighter. More than 40 years after Bowker retired from the ring, British boxing historian Maurice Golesworthy wrote of him: "Indeed, there are many authorities who rate Joe Bowker as the most skillful boxer ever produced in this country. That may be an exaggeration, but it is safe to say that there have been few better."

Biography

Birth and early career
Born 12 June 1881 in Salford, England, Joseph Lord Bowker sharpened his skills in the boxing booths of England. At age 16 he joined Billy Hughes' boxing booth, defeating 60 opponents over the next four years. At the age of 20 he won a novice bantamweight competition among 64 entries at the National Sporting Club in London.

Chicago bantamweight Harry Harris, who traveled to London in 1902 to fight Pedlar Palmer for the world title, saw the young Bowker spar and was impressed with his style and poise. "He is built on the same lines as Joe Walcott," Harris said. "He has broad shoulders, a deep chest, and long, muscular arms. He is very quick but he did not impress me as being much of a puncher. As for cleverness, I think he knows more about the game than either (Billy) Plimmer or Palmer, and they were pretty gifted."

Winning and defending the British Bantamweight Championship
In a very short time Bowker was rated the best bantamweight in Britain. He defeated Harry Ware in London for the British bantamweight championship on 15 December 1902, and successfully defended his title four times, beating Andrew Tokell, Bill King, Alf Fellows, and Owen Moran. The defeat of Fellows from Chicago, on 9 November 1903 at the National Sporting Club in London, was by a ninth-round knockout.

Winning the World Bantamweight Championship in 1904
On 17 October 1904 in London, Bowker defeated Frankie Neil of San Francisco for the world bantamweight championship. A slight favorite at 11 to 10, Bowker was behind in the early rounds and almost beaten in the ninth. From that point to the end of the 20-round bout, Bowker "greatly improved and administered plenty of punishment."

Following the fight, Jim Neil, father of Frankie Neil, protested to the referee that he thought his son should at least have earned a draw with Bowker. "Your boy swung repeatedly and missed," the referee explained to the elder Neil. "Now, if you were shooting at a bird and missed() that would be one for the bird, wouldn't it?"

Winning the British Featherweight Title in March of 1905
In taking the world title from Neil, it was reported that Bowker was the "first foreigner" (non-American) to win a world boxing championship.

On 20 March 1905, in London, Bowker knocked out Thomas "Pedlar" Palmer in the twelfth round to capture the British featherweight title. Two months later, on 29 May, Bowker successfully defended his world bantamweight title with a 20-round decision over Pinky Evans of Yonkers, New York. In 1906, Bowker confessed to reporters that he was too heavy at 115 pounds to defend his title. He subsequently abandoned his world bantamweight title and moved up to the featherweight division.

Failure to meet Abe Attell, and fight with Jim Driscoll in May 1906
What promised to be Bowker's biggest fight never materialized. Abe Attell, world featherweight champion, had decided in February 1906 to travel to London to fight the reigning world bantamweight champ. The 15-round bout was to be held in May at the National Sporting Club. Attell's title would be on the line. The match between Attell and Bowker was billed as "one of the most important international events" ever staged in England. Another report later that year had Bowker traveling to Los Angeles to take on the winner of the Attel-Neil bout. Attel defeated Neil on points on 4 July, but the Bowker-Attel fight never materialized.

The Welsh fighter, Jim Driscoll, proved to be Bowker's nemesis. Driscoll outpointed Bowker over 15 rounds in London on 28 May 1906, for the featherweight championship of Britain. In a rematch the following June, also in London, Bowker could not answer the bell after round 17.

Taking the Bantamweight championship of Europe in 1910
On 7 May 1910, a slimmer Bowker captured his fourth boxing title with an eighth-round knockout of Jean Audouy of France for the  bantamweight championship of Europe.

A controversial loss to Digger Stanley on 17 October 1910 at the National Sporting Club cost Bowker his European and British bantamweight titles. The purse for the fight was nearly $3,000. The bout ended suddenly, "a pitiful finish to a fine exhibition of boxing, in which Bowker proved himself the cleverer. But in getting down to weight Bowker weakened himself, which told in the end." The end was described by author Guy Deghy: "In the eighth round of a splendidly even battle, Bowker ducked into a righthander that struck him on the jaw, and got the next one on the kidney. While he lay on the floor, writhing in agony, the Club doctor, Dr. Gilbert Lynch, was sent for. At the end of his examination, the referee, Douglas, decided that there had been no foul, and Digger Stanley was awarded the first bantamweight Lonsdale Belt." Later, the kidney punch was banned from the sport.

Retirement from boxing in the early 1920s
After retiring from the ring, Bowker starred in boxing exhibitions. A "comedic boxing match" between Bowker and Wally Packard was on the card at London's first open air boxing contest on 31 July 1922. Bowker also worked as a fight trainer. At the 1924 Summer Olympics, he worked the corner of Harry Mallin, gold medal winner in the middleweight division. Later, he trained James O'Hanrahan who defeated Ed Tiernan in a unanimous decision at Madison Square Garden, New York, on 17 February 1925. "O'Hanrahan gave Tiernan a boxing lesson in every round and his obvious knowledge of the game and his clean punching, especially with his right hand, reflected great credit on his trainer Joe Bowker."

Bowker died in London on 22 October 1955 and lies buried in the Brockley & Ladywell Cemeteries.

Legacy and Tommy Mahon alias
Bowker was one of 80 boxers included in the popular Priddy Boxing Set of "Famous Boxers,"  published by W.R. Priddy Antiques in 1992.

In 2008, Bowker was ranked 74th on the all-time "top 100 British boxers" list, as compiled by Ron Lewis of The London Times.

Bowker's bout against Jim Driscoll for the British featherweight championship is the subject of a famous painting by W. Howard Robinson, the noted  representative artist and portrait painter of the early twentieth century. The painting, "An Evening at the National Sporting Club," completed in 1918, contains details of 329 sporting celebrities and took Robinson four years to complete.

Speculation about Bowker's date of birth, date of death, and even his real name began as early as 1908 when an Ogden's cigarette card inaccurately listed his birth date as 20 July 1882. With the discovery by family members in 2006 of Bowker's official birth, marriage and death certificates, these questions were put to rest.

A number of boxing historians have written incorrectly that Bowker's real name was Tommy Mahon and that he used Joe Bowker as an alias. The error may have originated from a book published in 1986 in which author Denis Fleming recalled a meeting with Bowker that had taken place more than a half-century earlier. Fleming wrote that Bowker had been "a 15-year-old urchin from the Salford side of Blackfriars Bridge" whose "real name was Tommy Mahon." Harry Mullen, the distinguished editor of Boxing News, perhaps assuming the accuracy of Fleming's account, perpetuated the myth. In a book published four years after Fleming's book, Mullen wrote that Bowker's real name was Tommy Mahon and that Bowker had been his mother's maiden name.

It's possible that Bowker used Tommy Mahon as an alias at prizefights he didn't want the National Sporting Club to know about, as he was under contract to fight exclusively at the NSC. It was reported that Bowker did tour with the boxing booths, as far as the west of Ireland, for extra income.

Professional boxing record

See also
List of bantamweight boxing champions

References

External links
 
 Joe Bowker - CBZ Profile

|-

|-

English male boxers
1881 births
1955 deaths
European Boxing Union champions
World boxing champions
World bantamweight boxing champions